James Russell Spotts (April 10, 1909 – June 15, 1964) was a Major League Baseball catcher.

Life and career
In three games, Spotts had no hits in 2 at-bats. He batted and threw right-handed.

Spotts was born in Honey Brook, Pennsylvania, and died in Medford, New Jersey.

External links

1909 births
1964 deaths
Baseball players from Pennsylvania
Cumberland Colts players
Major League Baseball catchers
Marshall Thundering Herd baseball players
People from Honey Brook, Pennsylvania
People from Medford, New Jersey
Philadelphia Phillies players